Zhao Mianchang (died 228 BC), was the consort of King Daoxiang of Zhao.

She was the concubine of the king. She was the mother of King Youmiu, and given the title of Queen Dowager when he became king. She had an affair with a high official and accepted bribes, and has been described as a bad role model in traditional Chinese history writing.

References 

3rd-century BC births
228 BC deaths
3rd-century BC Chinese women
3rd-century BC Chinese people